Dolenje Gradišče pri Šentjerneju is a settlement in the Municipality of Šentjernej in southeastern Slovenia. The area is part of the traditional region of Lower Carniola. It is now included in the Southeast Slovenia Statistical Region.

Name
The name of the settlement was changed from Dolenje Gradišče to Dolenje Gradišče pri Šentjerneju in 1953. In the past the German name was Untergradische.

Cultural heritage
Remains of a Roman villa rustica have been found in the hamlet of Lazice in the settlement.

References

External links
Dolenje Gradišče pri Šentjerneju on Geopedia

Populated places in the Municipality of Šentjernej